Ole Henrik Fagerås  (born 20 August 1939)  is a Norwegian nordic combined skier who competed in the early 1960s. He won a bronze medal in the individual event at the 1962 FIS Nordic World Ski Championships in Zakopane.

Fagerås also won the Nordic combined event at the 1962 Holmenkollen ski festival.

External links

Holmenkollen winners since 1892 - click Vinnere for downloadable pdf file 

1939 births
Holmenkollen Ski Festival winners
Norwegian male Nordic combined skiers
Living people
FIS Nordic World Ski Championships medalists in Nordic combined
20th-century Norwegian people